is a 2021 role-playing video game developed and published by Atlus for the Nintendo Switch. It is part of the Shin Megami Tensei series, the central series of the larger Megami Tensei franchise. Produced by Shin Megami Tensei IV director Kazuyuki Yamai, it was designed as a hybrid between Shin Megami Tensei III: Nocturne and Shin Megami Tensei IV, featuring returning gameplay mechanics such as raising and fusing demons. As of April 2022, the game sold over one million copies.

Synopsis

Setting
Shin Megami Tensei V is a role-playing video game that is set in modern-day Tokyo and the Netherworld. It features returning gameplay elements from previous Shin Megami Tensei games, such as the ability to fuse demons, along with new mechanics.

Plot
The protagonist, an ordinary high-school student, and his school friends Yuzuru Atsuta and Ichiro Dazai are caught up in a mysterious earthquake and transported to Da'at; an alternative apocalyptic version of Tokyo amidst an almighty battle between angels and demons. As he travels in this world, he shortly becomes overrun by demons and is nearly killed, only to be saved by a god-like being, Aogami. Together, they fuse into a Nahobino, a forbidden being that is neither human nor demon, but more so a deity. The protagonist traverses Da'at, clashes with a man named Shohei Yakumo and his demon partner Nuwa, and discovers a terminal that returns him and his friends to Tokyo. There, he learns that Yuzuru and fellow classmate Tao Isonokami are actually operatives of a clandestine international organization called Bethel focused on keeping humanity out of the war between angels and demons. Ichiro volunteers to join Bethel while the protagonist is conscripted due to his newfound powers as a Nahobino.

Two days later, demons from Da'at invade the protagonist's high school and abduct several of the students. The protagonist and his friends launch a rescue mission, during which Ichiro's self-esteem issues lead to him latching on to Bethel's angelic leader Abdiel. The protagonist rescues most of the kidnapped students, but Tao sacrifices herself to defeat the demons' commander, who was searching for (and manipulating) a human to merge with so it could become a Nahobino. In the aftermath, Bethel Japan's leader Hayao Koshimizu orders the protagonist and his friends to join a Bethel siege on the demons' stronghold in defiance of Abdiel's orders. The protagonist makes his way through the castle and kills the demon's leader, Arioch.

Afterwards, it is revealed that the creator god is dead and that a Nahobino must take His throne. With their common enemy dead, the various factions of Bethel splinter in the hopes of taking the Creator's throne for themselves. Koshimizu reveals that his true identity is Tsukuyomi, leader of the Amatsukami, and that he desires to restore the world to the rule of the gods of old; he is joined by Yuzuru in this endeavor. Ichiro convinces Abdiel to join him in restoring the will of God to the world, while Shohei and Nuwa declare their intent to destroy the Creator's throne outright and leave humanity's fate in its own hands. The protagonist, joined by a reincarnated Tao, makes his way to the Temple of Eternity and may side with any of the three warring factions. In all cases, the other candidates for the throne are all slain and the protagonist is confronted by God's killer Lucifer for a final battle (unless he chooses to destroy the throne). After defeating him, the protagonist can reshape the world as he sees fit.
If the protagonist elects to uphold God's order, he sacrifices humanity's freedom and self-determination to create a world of peace and harmony.
If the protagonist elects to restore the old gods, he creates a world of freedom and potential that is wracked with strife and conflict.
If the protagonist elects to destroy the throne, the conflicts that plague humanity and demonkind continue, although humanity's victory is inevitable.
Additionally, if the protagonist has completed several optional sidequests and initially sided with Shohei, he can accept Nuwa's alternate proposal to create a world for humanity alone. The protagonist removes all demons and gods from the world, including Aogami, and restores his friends to life before overseeing his new creation from afar.

Development
Shin Megami Tensei V is developed by Atlus, and is produced by Kazuyuki Yamai, who previously directed Shin Megami Tensei IV. One of the development team's goals with the game is to depict and sympathize with modern issues, such as unemployment, unease about retirement, terrorism and nuclear weapons, and home problems. The game is developed as a hybrid between the "profound charm" of Shin Megami Tensei III: Nocturne and the demon-raising gameplay in Shin Megami Tensei IV.

The game was developed using the game engine Unreal Engine 4, a first for Atlus; according to Yamai, moving to Unreal Engine 4 changed the way they create games, as the ability to create something and immediately see it within the game allows them to spend more time on trial and error and coming up with ideas. The decision to develop the game for the Nintendo Switch was made as Yamai liked its portability combined with its capability for high-definition graphics, although there were some challenges involved since Shin Megami Tensei V was Atlus's first time developing for the platform. The higher hardware capabilities of the Nintendo Switch meant that the demons in the game took approximately three times as long to develop when compared to previous Shin Megami Tensei games.

The game was revealed in January 2017 as part of Nintendo's unveiling of the Nintendo Switch console, in the form of a teaser trailer featuring a destroyed office building and a number of demons. At the time of the announcement, development had just started, and the game was presented as Shin Megami Tensei: Brand New Title; the Shin Megami Tensei V title was announced in October of the same year, to coincide with the 25th anniversary of the original Shin Megami Tensei, along with a new trailer showing a modern-day Tokyo train station and a post-apocalyptic city scene. At this point, Yamai described development as not even far enough for Atlus to be able to say "coming soon". By February 2018, he described the project as having entered "full-scale development", with more and more Atlus staff joining the production. Although Atlus USA did not initially know whether they would get to localize the game for the Western market, they still sent out a press release about the game's announcement in January 2017; an international release was announced in November 2017. Responding to worries about the development's progress following a lack of status updates, Atlus reaffirmed in 2019 that the game was still in active development.

Release 
Shin Megami Tensei V was released worldwide for the Nintendo Switch in November 2021, launching in Japan on November 11, 2021 before debuting overseas the following day. It is the first Atlus and Megami Tensei title to receive a worldwide simultaneous launch. The game was published by Atlus themselves in Japan, while parent company Sega released the game in North America, and Nintendo distributed the game in Europe. Alongside the game's standard release, the launch was accompanied by the distribution of a first-print steelbook edition available to those who pre-ordered or bought the game during the week of release, in addition to the "Fall of Man Premium Edition", which bundled the game with specialized packaging, a sling bag, a handbook chronicling all the demons found in the game, a t-shirt modeled after the main protagonist's school attire, and the game's soundtrack on two CDs.

Reception

Shin Megami Tensei V received "generally favorable reviews" according to Metacritic, and was nominated for best role-playing game at The Game Awards 2021, but lost to Tales of Arise. It debuted as the highest selling physical video game of the week in Japan, with an estimated 143,247 copies sold. It stayed in the top 10 for another two weeks and would go on to sell a total of 184,388 physical copies in Japan before dropping out of Famitsu's reports. In the UK, it debuted as the ninth highest selling, and outperformed other recent Japanese role-playing game releases in the region including Bravely Default II, Monster Hunter Stories 2: Wings of Ruin, and Tales of Arise. In a New Year's message published by Famitsu, Atlus announced that the game had sold 800,000 copies. In April 2022, Atlus announced that the game had sold over one million copies worldwide.

Polygon praised the scale of the game's world and writing, stating that "Despite the performance issues, the bigger areas and new engine allow for some creatures to be truly breathtaking and terrifying". IGNs Leana Hafer liked the essence system, feeling that it was "possible to create some absurdly powerful and specialized teams that can take on almost any challenge". GameSpot enjoyed the tension of actions in the game, "Every action in SMTV has a weight to it, and that's what makes the game so fun and engaging". Game Informer said "Shin Megami Tensei V makes smart improvements to its already strong core, creating an entertaining and rewarding journey".

George Yang of Bloody Disgusting gave the game a positive review, praising the modernity of the game, and the Tokyo setting, while calling it one of the best JRPGs of the year. Destructoid liked the fast-travel system, liking how the feature allowed players to teleport back before a boss or move between biomes easily. VG247 felt the refinements made to demon negotiation helped make the mechanic more understandable, with the reviewer stating "the tone of your answers when entering talks with a demon actually matter, and you’ll quickly build a familiarity with some of the more common personality traits of demons". Andrew Stretch of TechRaptor gave the game a very positive rating, summing up their review by saying "Shin Megami Tensei V understands its roots in RPG combat, demonic friendships, and plotlines about toppling gods. This new entry takes advantage of the next generation of Nintendo console and improves vastly in look, feel, and in world exploration".

Nintendo World Report's Donald Theriault praised the move to open world environments, writing that, "every square inch of the thoroughly nuked Tokyo has spots to explore".

Notes

References

External links
 

2021 video games
Atlus games
Nintendo Switch games
Nintendo Switch-only games
Post-apocalyptic video games
Role-playing video games
Shin Megami Tensei
Unreal Engine games
Video game sequels
Video games about demons
Video games developed in Japan
Video games set in Tokyo